Refugio Airport  is an airstrip serving Refugio, a river hamlet in the Santa Cruz Department of Bolivia.

See also

Transport in Bolivia
List of airports in Bolivia

References

External links 
OpenStreetMap - Refugio
OurAirports - Refugio
FallingRain - Refugio Airport

Airports in Santa Cruz Department (Bolivia)